Humphrey Brooke may refer to:
Humphrey Brooke (art historian) (1914–1988), British art historian
 Humphrey Brooke (physician) (1617–1693), English physician